KYES (1180 AM) is an American radio station licensed to serve the community of Rockville, Minnesota. The station is owned by Gabriel Media. The station's transmitter is located near Kimball, Minnesota, off MN 15. It can be heard throughout most of central Minnesota throughout the day with fringe coverage in the Twin Cities.

Station founder Andy Hilger began his radio career in 1958 as a disc jockey for WJON. Hilger later became owner and manager of WJON and three other stations in Central Minnesota.

Due to budgetary constraints, KYES shares radio studio space with KKJM ("Spirit 92.9") in Sauk Rapids, Minnesota—a radio station Hilger had donated to the Diocese of St. Cloud in 2000.

Programming
KYES broadcasts a Roman Catholic talk radio format to the greater St. Cloud, Minnesota, area. Programming includes local news, weather and sports, plus Catholic-oriented talk shows from Relevant Radio.

History
This station received its original construction permit from the Federal Communications Commission on January 25, 2006. In March 2006, permit holder D&E Communications applied to the FCC for permission to transfer the permit to Edward De La Hunt, Sr., of De La Hunt Broadcasting. The transfer was approved by the FCC on August 21, 2006, and the transaction was consummated the same day.

In January 2007, Edward De La Hunt, Sr., reached an agreement to transfer the permit to the Throw Fire Project, a Sauk Rapids-based nonprofit organization. The deal was approved by the FCC on March 13, 2007, and the transaction was consummated on May 31, 2007. The still-under construction station was assigned the KYES call sign by the FCC on June 14, 2007.

KYES applied for its license to cover from the FCC on May 27, 2009. The FCC formally accepted the application for filing on July 1, 2009.  The station began operating under program test authority granted by the FCC on July 10, 2009. The "official" launch date for KYES was held August 1, 2009. KYES formally received its broadcast license from the FCC on March 11, 2010.

KYES was sold by the Throw Fire Project to Gabriel Media. The sale was consummated on September 13, 2012, for consideration of $500,000.

References

External links
KYES official website

Radio stations in St. Cloud, Minnesota
Catholic radio stations
Talk radio stations in the United States
Radio stations established in 2009
Christian radio stations in Minnesota